Isoptena is a monotypic genus of insects belonging to the family Chloroperlidae. The only species is Isoptena serricornis.

See Also
Biological notes on Isoptena serricornis
Egg description of Isoptena serricornis

References

Chloroperlidae
Plecoptera genera
Monotypic insect genera